Touvedo Dam is a concrete gravity dam on the Limia. It is located in the municipality Ponte da Barca e Arcos de Valdevez, in Viana do Castelo District, Portugal.

Construction of the dam began in 1987. The dam was completed in 1993. It is owned by Companhia Portuguesa de Produção de Electricidade (CPPE). The dam is used for power generation, irrigation and flood control.

Dam
Touvedo Dam is a 42.5 m tall (height above foundation) and 133.5 m long gravity dam with a crest altitude of 55 m. The volume of the dam is 74,620 m³. The spillway with 3 cradial gates is part of the dam body (maximum discharge 3,200 m³/s). There is also a bottom outlet which can discharge up to 50 m³/s.

Reservoir
At full reservoir level of 50 m the reservoir of the dam has a surface area of 1.72 km² and a total capacity of 15.5 mio. m³. The active capacity is 4.5 (4.0) mio. m³. Minimum operating level is 47.5 m.

The reservoir of Touvedo Dam serves as lower reservoir for the Alto Lindoso pumped-storage power plant.

Power plant 
The hydroelectric power plant was commissioned in 1993. It is operated by EDP. The plant has a nameplate capacity of 22 MW. Its average annual generation is 66.8 (61, 67, or 78) GWh.

The power station contains one Kaplan turbine-generator with 22.2 MW (24 MVA) in a dam powerhouse located on the left side of the dam. The turbine rotation is 187.5 rpm. The minimum hydraulic head is 20 m, the maximum 25 m. Maximum flow per turbine is 100 m³/s.

The turbine and generator were provided by GEC-Alstom.

See also

 List of power stations in Portugal
 List of dams and reservoirs in Portugal

References

Dams in Portugal
Hydroelectric power stations in Portugal
Gravity dams
Dams completed in 1993
Energy infrastructure completed in 1993
1993 establishments in Portugal
Buildings and structures in Viana do Castelo District
Lima River
Ponte da Barca